George Russell may refer to:

Entertainment
 George Horne Russell (1861–1933), Canadian painter
 George William Russell (1867–1935), pseudonym "Æ", Irish critic, poet and painter
 George Russell (composer) (1923–2009), American jazz composer and theorist

Politics
 Lord George Russell (1790–1846), British general and diplomat
 Sir George Russell, 4th Baronet (1828–1898), British politician and barrister
 George Russell, 10th Duke of Bedford (1852–1893), British peer, politician and barrister
 George W. E. Russell (1853–1919), British Liberal Party politician
 George Warren Russell (1854–1937), New Zealand politician
 George Washington Russell (1879–1961), member of the Mississippi House of Representatives
 Ted Russell (Irish politician) (George Edward Russell, 1912–2004), Irish politician and company director

Sports
 George Russell (footballer, born 1869) (1869–1930), Scottish footballer
 George Russell (footballer, born 1893) (1893–?), English outside right
 George Russell (footballer, born 1902), English full back
 George Russell (racing driver) (born 1998), British racing driver

Other
 George Alfred Russell (1839–1926), Australian businessman in mining and insurance
 George Russell (horticulturist) (1857–1951), British horticulturalist, developed Russell Hybrid Lupins
 George Oscar Russell (1890–1962), American speech scientist
 George Vernon Russell (1905–1989), American architect
 George A. Russell (1921–2016),  American academic administrator, president of the University of Missouri system
 George E. Russell (1933–2016), Canadian painter and art teacher
 George Russell (serial killer) (born 1958), American thief and serial killer
 George Levi Russell III (born 1965), United States District Judge for the District of Maryland